Dortmund-Marten Süd station is a railway station in the Dortmund district of Marten in the German state of North Rhine-Westphalia. It is classified by Deutsche Bahn as a category 6 station and was opened on 30 May 1964. It is now located on a new line completed between Dortmund-Dorstfeld and Germania on 3 June 1984 and electrified between Dortmund-Marten Süd station and Germania on 28 August 1987.

It is served by Rhine-Ruhr S-Bahn line S 4 at 30-minute intervals (15-minute intervals in the peak between Dortmund-Lütgendortmund and ). It is served by Dortmund Stadtbahn line U 44 (Dorstfeld – Kampstr – Borsigplatz – Westfalenhütte) at 10-minute intervals. It is also served by bus routes 462 (Germania – Lütgendortmund – Bövinghausen – Kirchlinde – Huckarde + Uni - Barop), every 20 minutes), 463 (Germania – Lütgendortmund – Volksgarten + Marten), every 60 minutes), 464 (Feldgarten – Lütgendortmund), every 30 minutes), 466 (Dorstfeld – Bandelstr), every 20 minutes) and 480 (Kirchlinde – Schwerin – Castrop-Rauxel - Ickern), every 20 minutes), operated by DSW21.

References

S4 (Rhine-Ruhr S-Bahn)
Rhine-Ruhr S-Bahn stations
Railway stations in Dortmund
Dortmund VRR stations
Railway stations in Germany opened in 1964